The 2010–11 USHL season is the 32nd season of the United States Hockey League as an all-junior league. The regular season began on October 1, 2010, and concluded on April 9, 2011, with the regular season champion winning the Anderson Cup. The 2010–11 season was the first to include the Dubuque Fighting Saints and Muskegon Lumberjacks, both of whom were resurrected franchises of the same name (USHL and IHL respectively)

The Clark Cup playoffs featured the top six teams from each conference competing for the league title. The increase to twelve teams resulted from the addition of four teams in two years.

Regular season
Current standings as of November 7, 2010

Note: GP = Games played; W = Wins; L = Losses; OTL = Overtime losses; SL = Shootout losses; GF = Goals for; GA = Goals against; PTS = Points; x = clinched playoff berth; y = clinched division title; z = clinched conference title

Eastern Conference

Western Conference

Clark Cup Playoffs

Players

Scoring leaders
Note: GP = Games played; G = Goals; A = Assists; Pts = Points; PIM = Penalty minutes

Leading goaltenders
Note: GP = Games played; Mins = Minutes played; W = Wins; L = Losses: OTL = Overtime losses; SL = Shootout losses; GA = Goals Allowed; SO = Shutouts; GAA = Goals against average

All-Star teams

First Team
 Brady Hjelle (Goalie) Cedar Rapids RoughRiders
 Blake Coleman (Forward)Indiana Ice 
 Jayson Megna (Forward) Cedar Rapids RoughRiders
 Jimmy Mullin (Forward) Fargo Force
 Nick Mattson (Defense) Indiana Ice
 Jordan Schmaltz (Defense) Sioux City Musketeers

Second Team
 Ryan McKay (Goalie) Green Bay Gamblers
 Matt Morris (Goalie) Dubuque Fighting Saints
 Daniil Tarasov (Forward) Indiana Ice
 John Gaudreau (Forward) Dubuque Fighting Saints 
 Vinny Saponari (Forward) Dubuque Fighting Saints 
 Brian Cooper (Defense) Fargo Force
 Ben Marshall (Defense) Omaha Lancers

External links
 Official website of the United States Hockey League

References

USHL
United States Hockey League seasons